Lam Tak Chuen (born 21 March 1955) is a Hong Kong fencer. He competed in the individual and team foil and épée events at the 1984 Summer Olympics.

References

External links
 

1955 births
Living people
Hong Kong male épée fencers
Olympic fencers of Hong Kong
Fencers at the 1984 Summer Olympics
Hong Kong male foil fencers
20th-century Hong Kong people